Robbery Under Arms is a 1950 BBC radio adaptation of Rolf Boldrewood's popular 1888 novel Robbery Under Arms.

The novel was adapted by Rex Rienits. It consisted of 10 episodes, each running 30 minutes.

The cast was almost entirely Australian. John Bushelle played the lead, with Edward Howell and Mary Ward supporting.

Rolf Bolderwood's daughter praised the adaptation.

The novel had been adapted for Australian radio in 1943.

Episodes
Terrible Hollow (2 January 1950)
Captain Starlight (9 January 1950)
The Great Cattle Theft (16 January 1950)
The Prison-Break (23 January 1950)
Bushrangers! (30 January 1950)
Gold (6 February 1950)
The Betrayal (13 February 1950)
The Big Hold-up (20 February 1950)
The End Approaches (27 February 1950)
The End of the Story (6 March 1950)

References

External links
Robbery Under Arms 1950 radio version at AustLit

BBC Home Service programmes
1950 radio programme debuts
1950 radio programme endings
Radio programs based on works